The San Francisco Bay Trail is a bicycle and pedestrian trail that when finished will allow continuous travel around the shoreline of San Francisco Bay. As of 2020,  of the trail have been completed. It is a project of the Association of Bay Area Governments (ABAG) and the Metropolitan Transportation Commission (MTC), in collaboration with other agencies, private companies, non-profit organizations, and advocacy groups.

The trail is intended to provide recreation for hikers and bicyclists, viewpoints for wildlife, space for environmental education, and corridors for bicycle transportation as well as access to historic, natural and cultural sites, including over 130 parks.

Route

The Bay Trail is an interconnected trail system that links parks, open spaces, points of interest, and communities on or near the bay shoreline. It will not only encircle the Bay but will also provide access inland to open spaces and preserves, streams, and the Bay Area Ridge Trail, which forms the second of two concentric rings around the bay.

Sections of the Bay Trail exist in all nine Bay Area counties. The longest continuous segments include  primarily on gravel levees between East Palo Alto and San Jose in Santa Clara County;  in San Mateo County between Millbrae and San Carlos;  in central Alameda County from San Leandro to Hayward; and  along the shoreline and on city streets through Richmond in Contra Costa County. The northernmost trail section passes through San Pablo Bay National Wildlife Refuge.

Protected bicycle and pedestrian lanes exist on six Bay Area toll bridges: Golden Gate Bridge, Carquinez Bridge, Benicia-Martinez Bridge, Dumbarton Bridge, the Richmond-San Rafael Bridge, and the Bay Bridge. In the last case, the path cannot be used to cross the bay, as the western span lacks a bike path. The San Mateo–Hayward Bridge, the longest bridge in California, currently lacks a pedestrian or bike path entirely.

History

The idea for the Bay Trail was launched in the Fall of 1986, when state Senator Bill Lockyer of Hayward was having lunch with a local editor in a waterfront restaurant. The end-of-session legislative frenzy was over, and Senator Lockyer was in a reflective mood. “Let me try this idea out on you,” he said to his companion. “What if we tried to develop a pedestrian and bicycle path around the bay, with access to the shoreline?” His luncheon partner applauded the idea and urged the senator to pursue it. The outcome was Senate Bill 100. Coauthored by all Bay Area legislators, the bill passed. It defined parameters of the planning process, designated the Association of Bay Area Governments (ABAG) as the lead agency, and provided $300,000 for the preparation of a Bay Trail Plan by July 1, 1989. The Bay Trail Plan, adopted by ABAG, shows a network of trails that meander and loop along the shore, connecting all nine surrounding counties and crossing the region's toll bridges.

Publications

San Francisco Bay Shoreline Guide
The San Francisco Bay Shoreline Guide was revised in 2012. It provides information about the natural and cultural history of San Francisco Bay and includes maps for 325 miles of the shoreline Bay Trail open to the public. Published by University of California Press for the California Coastal Conservancy.

San Francisco Bay Trail Maps
The San Francisco Bay Trail maps were released in May 2013 and last updated in 2018. The box set of 25 cards and a large fold-out map provide detailed information about the trail and points of interest along its route. Production of the maps was funded in part by the California Coastal Conservancy.

The Bay Trail Plan
The San Francisco Bay Trail Plan: A Recreational Ring Around San Francisco Bay was published in 1989 by the Association of Bay Area Governments. The plan includes the trail alignment, project goals, policies and implementation strategies for the Bay Trail.

Gallery

See also

Bay Area Ridge Trail
San Francisco Bay Area Water Trail, a proposal to create a safely navigable water "trail" for nonmotorized beachable watercraft, circumnavigating the bay.

References

External links

San Francisco Bay Trail
San Francisco Bay Area Water Trail
Walking San Francisco Bay
The San Francisco Bay Trail: It's Closer Than You Think
The San Francisco Bay Trail Plan: A Recreational Ring Around San Francisco Bay

 
Bike paths in the San Francisco Bay Area
Long-distance trails in the United States
Trails in the San Francisco Bay Area
Transportation in Contra Costa County, California
Transportation in San Francisco
Transportation in Alameda County, California
Transportation in Santa Clara County, California
Transportation in San Mateo County, California
Transportation in Marin County, California